CATA Línea Aérea was an airline based in Buenos Aires, Argentina. It operated domestic scheduled and chartered flights, out of its base at Moron Airport, as well as from Ministro Pistarini International Airport, Aeroparque Jorge Newbery, Almirante Marco Andrés Zar Airport, and Ingeniero Aeronáutico Ambrosio L.V. Taravella International Airport.

History 
The airline was established and started operations in 1986. It was wholly owned by Grupo Pesquera ICS Argentina. All flights were suspended since 2006, and bankruptcy was formally declared on March 28, 2008.

Fleet 

The CATA fleet included the following aircraft:

5 Fairchild Hiller FH-227
1 IAI Arava

Accidents and incidents 
 On 26 October, 2003, Fairchild FH-227 LV-MGV crashed SW of Buenos Aires, Argentina. All 5 occupants died and the aircraft was totally destroyed.

External links
 CATA Línea Aérea (defunct)
 Aviation Safety Net wepsite, CATA page (accessed 2015-03-15)

References 

Defunct airlines of Argentina
Airlines established in 1986
Airlines disestablished in 2006
2006 disestablishments in Argentina
Argentine companies established in 1986